Gyaros, also locally known as Gioura, is an arid, unpopulated, and uninhabited Greek island in the northern Cyclades near the islands of Andros and Tinos, with an area of . It is a part of the municipality of Ano Syros, which lies primarily on the island of Syros. This and other small islands of the Aegean Sea served as places of exile for important persons in the early Roman empire.  The extremity of its desolation was proverbial among Roman authors, such as Tacitus and Juvenal.  It was a place of exile for leftist political dissidents in Greece from 1948 until 1974. At least 22,000 people were exiled or imprisoned on the island during that time. It is an island of great ecological importance as it hosts the largest population of monk seals in the Mediterranean.

Mythology and early history 
The pseudo-Aristotelian work On Marvellous Things Heard (25) recounts the tale that on Gyaros the mice eat iron.

In the Aeneid of Virgil, Gyaros and Mykonos are said to be the two islands to which the god Apollo tied the holy island of Delos to stop its wandering over the Aegean Sea.  In his recounting of the myth of the war between Minos and Aegeus, the king of Athens, the poet Ovid speaks of Gyaros as one island that refused to join the campaign of the Cretan king.

In 29 BC, the historian and geographer Strabo had an extended stay on the island, on his way to Corinth. 
 
He also records that the inhabitants of Gyaros were once put to flight by (a plague of) mice. The island is also mentioned by the Roman orator Cicero, and other notable Latin authors, indicating a broad awareness of Gyaros among the educated elite of the 1st century BC to the 2nd century AD.

Exile island during the early Roman Empire 

The island also served as a place of exile during the early Roman Empire. Writing in the early 2nd century AD, the Roman historian Tacitus records that, when Silanus, the proconsul of the province of Asia, was accused of extortion and treason, and it had been proposed in the Roman Senate that he be exiled to Gyaros, the Roman Emperor Tiberius allowed him to be sent to the nearby island of Kythnos instead, since Gyaros was "harsh and devoid of human culture" (Annales 3.68-69). When confronted with another recommendation to exile a defendant to Gyaros, Tiberius once more declined, noting that the island was deficient in water, and that those granted their lives ought to be granted the means to live (4.30). The defendant was allowed to go into exile on Amorgos instead. The Roman poet Juvenal, a near-contemporary of Tacitus, mentions this island twice in his Satires: first as a place of exile for particularly vile criminals (1.73), and second as a symbol of claustrophobic imprisonment (10.170). In the second reference, Juvenal compares the restlessness of Alexander the Great to that of a man imprisoned:

 One globe was not enough for the youth from Pella,
 He seethed within the narrow confines of the world,
 as if he were hemmed in by the cliffs of Gyara or by tiny Seriphos.

 unus Pellaeo iuueni non sufficit orbis,
 aestuat infelix angusto limite mundi
 ut Gyarae clausus scopulis paruaque Seripho;
 (1.168-70)

Under emperor Nero, the philosopher Musonius Rufus was found guilty for his participation in the Pisonian conspiracy and was banished to Gyara.

Exile island during the 20th century 

There is a red brick prison building which during the years 1948 to 1953 held approximately 10,000 men in custody due to their participation in the Greek Resistance organization Ethniko Apeleftherotiko Metopo (EAM). Many of them were also involved in the Greek civil war (1945–1949). Jehovah's Witnesses were also sentenced to exile there as Christian conscientious objectors.

The prison was used again during the years 1967 to 1974 and during the Greek junta. The structures are decaying due to weathering, and no maintenance is conducted. In four separate places north of the prison building, there are also the ruins of the camps where the men lived in tents, both summer and winter. Once a year, the men and women who are alive and in good health (most of them were born between the 1910s and 1930s) who were formerly imprisoned on the island for their political views pay tribute by visiting the island and holding a ceremony in the cemetery of the men who left their last breath on this island.

The Greek government used the island as a target range for the Hellenic Navy until the year 2000.  Currently the island is off-limits to the general public and approaching or fishing in close proximity is forbidden by the coast guard.

References

External links
Fred Ihrt's photos of the concentration camp on Gyaros in 1967
Gyaros Documentation 2014

Cyclades
Internment camps
Former populated places in Greece
Uninhabited islands of Greece
History of Greece (1949–1974)
Landforms of Syros
Islands of the South Aegean
Islands of Greece
Populated places in the ancient Aegean islands